

The Rutan Model 202 Boomerang is an aircraft designed and built by Burt Rutan. The design was intended to be a multi-engine aircraft that in the event of failure of a single engine would not become dangerously difficult to control due to asymmetric thrust. The result is an asymmetrical aircraft with a very distinct appearance.

Design and development

The Boomerang was designed around the specifications of the Beechcraft Baron 58, one of the best known and most numerous twin-engine civilian aircraft. The use of the asymmetrical design allows the Boomerang to fly faster and farther than the Baron using smaller engines, and seating the same number of occupants.
The Boomerang is powered by two engines, with the right engine producing 10 hp (8 kW) more power than the left one (the engines are in fact the same model, just rated differently). The wings are forward-swept.

In 1997, avionics entrepreneur Ray Morrow and his son, Neil Morrow, founded an air taxi company. They settled on a modified version of Rutan's Boomerang design, which they designated the MB-300. They determined that the best business approach would be to manufacture the aircraft and run the air taxi services themselves. So Ray Morrow founded Morrow Aircraft Corporation in order to design and manufacture the MB-300. In the meantime, they started the SkyTaxi company using Cessna 414s as interim aircraft.
In 1999, Morrow Aircraft Corporation applied to the Federal Aviation Administration (FAA) of the United States for a type certificate for the MB-300. In 2000, the FAA published a notice seeking comments on Morrow Aircraft's proposal to use an electronic engine control system (FADEC) in place of the engine's mechanical system.

Rutan's Boomerang was restored to flying condition in 2011 and made an appearance at Oshkosh that year as part of the Tribute to Rutan.

Specifications (Boomerang)

See also
 Blohm & Voss BV 141 - asymmetric German design of World War II

References

External links

Autopia - Burt Rutan’s Boomerang: Safety Through Asymmetry - July 29, 2011
SCALED and RAF Manned Research Projects - April 2011

1990s United States civil utility aircraft
Boomerang
Asymmetrical aircraft
Twin-fuselage aircraft
Forward-swept-wing aircraft
Aircraft first flown in 1996
Twin piston-engined tractor aircraft